Chief Wapahaska (fl. 1880s), also known as Chief Whitecap, was a Dakota chief from the area now known as Whitecap Dakota Reserve.

Founding of Saskatoon
John Lake of the Temperance Colonization Society of Toronto arrived in what is now Saskatoon in 1882 to survey the land. Whitecap advised that Lake begin the settlement on the east bank of the South Saskatchewan River, which would later become Nutana.

Later life
Whitecap was a participant in the North-West Rebellion, and was tried for treason after Louis Riel's surrender. He was later found not guilty.

References 

Dakota people
19th-century First Nations people
First Nations history
People of the North-West Rebellion
Indigenous leaders in Saskatchewan
Year of birth unknown
Year of death unknown